Semyon Kotko, Op. 81, is an opera in five acts by Sergei Prokofiev to a libretto by Sergei Prokofiev and Valentin Katayev based on Katayev's 1937 novel I, Son of Working People. It was premiered on 23 June 1940 at the Stanislavsky Opera Theatre in Moscow.

Composition history
One of only two operas written by Prokofiev on a Soviet subject (the other being The Story of a Real Man), Semyon Kotko was composed between the summers of 1938 and 1939. From the beginning, it was intended that the opera would be produced by the brilliant director and a great friend of Prokofiev, Vsevolod Meyerhold, who was at that time the director of the Stanislavsky Opera Theatre. Both Prokofiev and Meyerhold had tried to plan productions of several of Prokofiev's operas in the past, but all of them had failed. However, on 20 June 1939, just a week before Prokofiev completed the piano score of Semyon Kotko, Meyerhold was arrested. Nothing would be heard about his fate from then on; many years later it was revealed that he had been shot in February 1940. The whole production fell into jeopardy. An actress, Serafima Birman, took Meyerhold's place, but the result was dissatisfying. The opera was further compromised by the Nazi-Soviet pact, which made it necessary to change the operatic enemies from Germans to haydamaks (Ukrainian nationalists).

Performance history
The reception of Semyon Kotko at its premiere was moderately enthusiastic, but at that time ideology took precedence over all other considerations, and discussions in the press focused exclusively around Semyon Kotko'''s importance as a “Soviet Opera”. The inherent quality of the music was simply ignored. Yet the production made a deep impression on the pianist Sviatoslav Richter, who recalled: "The premiere of the opera was a momentous event in my life [...] That evening, when I first heard Semyon Kotko, I understood that Prokofiev was a great composer."

The opera was dropped from the Soviet repertoire in 1941, and it was not staged again anywhere until 1958 at Brno in Czechoslovakia. It finally entered the repertory of the Bolshoi Theatre in Moscow in 1970, and it is now one of the main repertory staples of the Kirov Opera at the Mariinsky Theatre, St. Petersburg, where it has been repeatedly conducted by Prokofiev interpreter Valery Gergiev.

Prokofiev later extracted an orchestral suite (Op. 81a) from the opera.

Roles

Synopsis
Place: Ukraine
Time: 1918.

The newly established Bolshevik government has reached peace with the Germans, but some of their forces still occupy the territory. The advancing Red Army is hampered by Ukrainian nationalists and the remaining Germans. Semyon, a demobilized soldier and prominent young man in his village, is hoping to marry Sofya, daughter of the wealthy Tkachenko. The latter hopes to restore the old order and plots with loyalist elements and Germans to undermine the revolution and to thwart Semyon's marital intentions. In the end, Semyon, after Tkachenko's intrigues have cost the lives of two friends, is reunited with Sofya, and Tkachenko is arrested and executed leaving behind the merry chorus of the Red Army.

Recordings

Suite from Semyon Kotko
The orchestral suite, Op. 81a, consists of 8 movements, lasting around 40 minutes.IntroductionSemyon and His MotherThe BetrothalThe Southern NightExecutionThe Village is BurningFuneralOurs Have Come''

Recordings of the suite

References

Operas by Sergei Prokofiev
Russian-language operas
Operas
1939 operas
1940 operas
Operas set in Ukraine
Operas based on novels